Saint Spyridon Church is a Serbian Orthodox church in Trieste, Italy.

History 
The Orthodox community in Trieste was established in 1748 but it was not until 1751 when Empress Maria Theresa allowed the free exercise of religion for Orthodox Christians. This prompted the immigration of Serbian traders from Herceg Novi, Trebinje and Sarajevo to Trieste. The first Eastern Orthodox Church was built in the mid-18th century and it served as a place of worship for both local Serbs and Greeks. It was thanks to Damaskinos Omiros, a well-traveled Greek monk from Mount Athos who went to Vienna to consult with the empress in person, that the wheels were set in motion.

In 1752 the Serbian Orthodox Metropolitan Vasilije Petrović celebrated the liturgy on his stopover in Trieste and elevated Father Damaskin (Omiros) to archimandrite. Soon after the momentous beginning, the Greek congregation ran into financial trouble, and the Serbs came to their aid and eventually paid off the debt.

The Orthodox church was completed by 1756 and Jovo Kurtović was elected president of the new church board on 4 May 1757. 

That the Serbs were an essential part of the parish is without doubt, and they soon requested that a Serbian priest be assigned to Saint Spyridon in addition to the three existing Greek priests. Only Katerina Kurtović, the wife of Jovo Kurtović, understood some Greek, while the rest of the Serbs were unable to understand the liturgy or communicate with the priests without an interpreter. 

Maria Theresa had appointed Father Damaskin the head of the parish, but the question of Serbian priests presented a continuing jurisdictional impediment. The ecclesiastical service for the Serbs of Trieste was at times under the Upper Karlovac Diocese and the Karlovac Bishop Danilo Jakšić (1750–1777) sent messages to Trieste through the head of the Gomirje monastery, Teofil Aleksić.

In 1759 Bishop Jakšić sent the first Serbian priest, Father Melentije, to Trieste, but in less than a year he was transferred first to serve the Russians and then to the Serbian chapel of St. George in Vienna. In 1761, Jakšić sent Trieste a second priest, Teodosije Marković, but he did not stay long either. 

Much of the information known about the Serbs of Trieste in this period comes from the attempts of Trieste's Serbs to document their numbers and their social and economic standing in order to justify their request for a permanent Serbian priest. At one point in 1769 the Serbs reminded the empress of their wealth and suggested that another city might be more amenable for their trade. Only then did Maria Theresa issue the Triestine Serbs the right to have an "Illyrian" (Serbian) priest. The first permanent Serbian priest in Trieste was Haralampije Mamula from Ogulin in the western Military Frontier.
He served from 1771 until his death in 1790. 

Such issues of church affairs between the ecclesiastical and the state (Maria Theresa) led to the dissolution of the joint community in 1781. The Greek left Saint Spyridon and later built a new church dedicated to St. Nicholas. The Serbs eventually paid them 20,000 florins for their share of Saint Spyridon. The separate Serb community continued its work independently and as early as 1782 it was officially established.

Due to the instability of the grounds on which the first church was erected, a joint decision was made to demolish the existing one and to erect the second church. The construction began on March 2, 1861, and it was designed by architect Carlo Maciachini. The exterior decor was entrusted to Pompey Bertini and Antony Karelia, the interior painted decorations and design of exterior decorations were produced by Giuseppe Bertini, and Emilio Bisi produced sculptures for the facade. The marble used to build the church comes from Carrara, Verona, Karst Plateau and Istria. The construction of the church was finished on September 2, 1868, and a small consecration took place on September 20, 1869.

From 1994 up to administrative changes within the dioceses of the Serbian Orthodox Church, the parish in Trieste fell within the Metropolitanate of Zagreb and Ljubljana. Since 2011, it is under the jurisdiction of the Serbian Orthodox Eparchy of Austria and Switzerland.

Saint Spyridon Church treasury holds numerous objects, historical documents, icons and various works of art, dating back to 1751.

Next to the church is a Serbian curriculum school. The school is named for Jovan Miletić, a wealthy merchant from Sarajevo who in his will left 24,000 florins for the education of the Serbian children of Trieste.

Gallery

See also
Serbs in Italy
Scuola di San Giorgio degli Schiavoni

References

External links

Neo-Byzantine architecture
Serbian Orthodox church buildings in Italy
Buildings and structures in Trieste
Churches in the province of Trieste
Churches completed in 1868